FCR is an American outsource provider of call centers. Based in Roseburg, Oregon, FCR was founded in 2005 as Comspan Call Center Services, a division of the communications company, Comspan. After the communications company was bought by a Canadian corporation, the call center was established as its own company by Comspan co-founder John Stadter and business partner Matthew Achak.

FCR is one of the fastest growing businesses in Oregon and has been named one of the Top Workplaces by The Oregonian for four consecutive years since 2012.

The company has over 90 clients in industries including financial, healthcare, retail, e-commerce, as well as start-ups and technology companies based in Silicon Valley. FCR also works with insurance companies and other organizations during natural disasters including Hurricane Katrina. FCR maintains a sales office in Seattle, WA and operates call centers throughout Oregon in Roseburg, Grants Pass, Coos Bay, Veneta, Eugene and Independence, as well as in Great Falls, Helena and Butte, MT.

FCR was recognized by Forbes.com as a Company To Watch, citing trends in the call center industry where companies make significant investments in human capital and technology to communicate more effectively with Millennials.

FCR was written up by Business View Magazine in April 2018 as an innovative domestic based outsourcer of call center services.

References

Business services companies established in 2005
Roseburg, Oregon
2005 establishments in Oregon
Companies based in Oregon
American companies established in 2005